Lac de Bareilles is a lake in Hautes-Pyrénées, France. The lake can be reached by foot from the village of Bareilles in 30 minutes.

Lakes of Hautes-Pyrénées